KUBO (88.7 FM) is a community radio station broadcasting in a Variety format, serving the Calexico, California area.  The station is currently owned by Radio Bilingüe, Inc. with programs in the English and Spanish languages.

External links

UBO
UBO
Community radio stations in the United States
Calexico, California
Imperial County, California